Karol Landowski (born 23 February 2000) is a Polish professional footballer who plays for Olimpia Grudziądz as a midfielder.

Biography

Born in Starogard Gdański, Landowski started playing football with the youth sides of Beniaminek 03 Starogard Gdański and KP Starogard Gdański. At the age of 13 Landowski moved to Gdańsk joining AP Lechia Gdańsk staying at ALPG until 2016 when he joined the Lechia Gdańsk academy. For the 2017–2018 season Landowski went on loan to the Górnik Zabrze U19's, also featuring for the Górnik Zabrze II, playing twice for the team in the III liga. In 2018 Landowski started to feature for the Lechia Gdańsk II team in the IV liga. In his first season playing for Lechia II he made 25 appearances, scoring 3 goals in the process. During the autumn phase of the 2019–2020 season, Landowski went on loan to I liga team Stomil Olsztyn. His first professional appearance in the leagues came for Stomil against GKS Bełchatów. Landowski didn't play for the first team again, instead playing 15 times for the Stomil Olsztyn II team for the rest of the season. After his loan spell away to Stomil, Landowski once again returned to the Lechia II team, playing with the team for the 2020–2021 season.

References

Living people
2000 births
Polish footballers
Association football midfielders
Lechia Gdańsk players
Lechia Gdańsk II players
Górnik Zabrze players
OKS Stomil Olsztyn players
Olimpia Grudziądz players
III liga players
IV liga players